Middleburg may refer to several places:

United States 
Middleburg, Florida
Middleburg, Iowa
Middleburg, Kentucky
Middleburg, Carroll County, Maryland
Middleburg, Washington County, Maryland
 Middleburg, a Dutch settlement on Long Island, now Elmhurst, Queens, New York, U.S.
Middleburg, North Carolina
Middleburg, Jefferson County, Ohio
Middleburg, Logan County, Ohio
Middleburg, Noble County, Ohio
Middleburg, Seneca County, Ohio
Middleburg, Pennsylvania
Middleburg, Virginia

Other places
 Middleburg Island or Pulau Middelburg, Tambrauw, an island in West Papua, Indonesia

See also
Middleburg Heights, Ohio
Middleburg Township, Ohio
Middleburgh (disambiguation)
Middelburg (disambiguation)
Middleberg (disambiguation)
Middletown (disambiguation)